{{DISPLAYTITLE:C26H30O11}}
The molecular formula C26H30O11 (molar mass: 518.50 g/mol, exact mass: 518.1788 u) may refer to:

 Phellamurin
 Rubratoxin B

Molecular formulas